"Queen of the Rapping Scene (Nothing Ever Goes the Way You Plan)" is a song by English band Modern Romance featuring female vocals by Techno Twins vocalist Bev Sage. It was released as a single in 1982 and reached #37 on the UK Singles Chart, earning them a slot on Top of the Pops.

In the Netherlands it was their only chart hit, making it to number 25 in the top 40

References

1982 singles
Modern Romance (band) songs
1982 songs
Warner Music Group singles
Songs written by Geoff Deane
Songs written by David Jaymes